Bram or Bräm is a surname. Notable people with the surname include:

 Christopher Bram (born 1952), American author
 Leila Bram (1927–1979), American mathematician
 Richard Bram (born 1952), American street photographer
 Thüring Bräm (born 1944), Swiss composer and conductor